Pétur Georg Markan (born 16 February 1981) is an Icelandic theologian, politician and former footballer. He played for several seasons in the Icelandic top-tier Úrvalsdeild karla for Fjölnir, Valur and Víkingur. In 2013, he was a member of Alþingi for the Social Democratic Alliance.

Pétur was the mayor of Súðavík from 2014 to 2019 when he was hired as the communications manager of the Church of Iceland.

In April 2021, he left the Social Democratic Alliance after having been a member for 22 years and joined the Liberal Reform Party.

Personal life
Pétur was born in Reykjavík, Iceland, and grew up inn Fossvogur. When he was 17 years old, Pétur's father died of lung cancer. He is married to Margrét Lilja Vilmundardóttir and together they have three children.

References

External links

Alþingi profile

1981 births
Living people
Association football forwards
Petur Georg Markan
Petur Georg Markan
Petur Georg Markan
Petur Georg Markan
Petur Georg Markan
Petur Georg Markan
Petur Georg Markan